David de Navas Alcalá (born 7 December 1976) is a Spanish retired professional footballer who played as a goalkeeper.

Club career
Born in Alcobendas, Community of Madrid, de Navas played 70 games in Segunda División over a 20-year senior career, 51 with CE Sabadell FC and 19 with Racing de Ferrol. He made his debut in the competition on 7 January 2001 while at the service of the latter club, in a 2–1 home win against Getafe CF.

In the 2011–12 season, de Navas only missed four league matches in 42 to help Catalonia's Sabadell remain in the second tier, one year after promoting.

References

External links

Stats and bio at Historia Racinguista 

1976 births
Living people
People from Alcobendas
Spanish footballers
Footballers from the Community of Madrid
Association football goalkeepers
Segunda División players
Segunda División B players
Tercera División players
Atlético Madrid C players
Racing de Ferrol footballers
Real Jaén footballers
Benidorm CF footballers
UD Melilla footballers
CE Sabadell FC footballers